The 2006–07 South Western Football League season was the 56th and last in the history of South Western League. The league consisted of 19 teams.

League table

The division featured 19 teams, 17 from last season and 2 new teams:
 Saltash United from Western League
 Plymouth Argyle "A"

References

9